Parkside is a village in the Canadian province of Saskatchewan within the Rural Municipality of Leask No. 464 and Census Division No. 16.

History 
Parkside incorporated as a village on February 21, 1913.

Demographics 

See also 
 List of communities in Saskatchewan
 Villages of Saskatchewan

References

Villages in Saskatchewan
Leask No. 464, Saskatchewan
Division No. 16, Saskatchewan